Emmanuelle Zeesman (born 20th century) is a Canadian actress of film, stage and television, as well as a singer, musical director, and choreographer working primarily in the United States and in Canada.  Emmanuelle has also performed throughout Australia, Asia and Europe. Emmanuelle is also a pianist, a trumpet player, and tin whistler.

She graduated from the University of Windsor Musical Theatre Performance Program before becoming an instructor at the Ottawa School of Speech and Drama.  She is a member of A Company of Fools Theatre Inc., a not-for-profit professional theatre company that presents Shakespeare plays in a format that employs editing, improvisation, costumes, make up, physical comedy, and local and contemporary references to appeal to broad audiences, including children and the Shakespeare uninitiated.

In addition to her education at Windsor, Emmanuelle is a graduate of École Philippe Gaulier, and she has studied under leading Canadian acting, musical theatre, and choreography coaches.

Performances

Movies and television
Emmanuelle played the role of Lou Anne in the short film ‘Mercy’.  Her credits also list her as performing in various film and television roles (acting, dancing, hosting), including ‘'A Lover’s Revenge'’, ‘'First Comes Love'’, ‘'Getting Along Famously'’, ‘'Officier Croupier'’, and ‘'The Breakfast Club'’ (Rogers Cable and the New RO, not the John Hughes film).

Theatrical performances
Her theatrical performances are tabled below.

Awards
In 2010 the Capital Critics Circle (CCC) awarded her the title of Best Professional Actor for her role in Blood Brothers at the Gladstone Theatre.  Alvina Ruprecht of the CCC, and resident theatrical critic of the Canadian Broadcasting Corporation,  describes Zeesman’s performance as "absolutely magnificent as Mrs Johnstone, the worried, harassed debt ridden mother who can’t  pay, can’t control her oldest boys … Zeesman’s singing brings great depth to all these emotional situations.  As well as being a strong singer she has also become a serious actress. The final number, Tell me it’s not true, as she bends over the two bodies of her dead sons, was the culmination of a great performance".

References

External links
 
 Emmanuelle Zeesman website http://www.emmanuellezeesman.com/

Year of birth missing (living people)
20th-century births
20th-century Canadian actresses
20th-century Canadian educators
21st-century Canadian actresses

Actresses from Ottawa
Canadian choreographers
Canadian educators
Canadian female dancers
Canadian film actresses
Canadian musical theatre actresses
Canadian musical theatre directors
Canadian television actresses
Living people
Musicians from Ottawa
University of Windsor alumni
20th-century Canadian women singers
21st-century Canadian educators
21st-century Canadian women singers
20th-century women educators
21st-century women educators
Canadian women choreographers